Philibert Berthelier may refer to:
Philibert Berthelier (Geneva patriot) ( 1465–1519), one of the first martyrs in Geneva's fight for liberty
Philibert Berthelier (Son of Geneva patriot), son of the Geneva patriot who clashed with John Calvin